Los Ebanos may refer to:
 Los Ebanos, Hidalgo County, Texas
 Los Ebanos, Starr County, Texas